This page lists notable alumni and students of Fu Jen Catholic University.

Linkage of nobel laureate
Wei-min Hao, climate scientist and contributor to the Intergovernmental Panel on Climate Change; shared the 2007 Nobel Peace Prize.

Politics

Premier
 Lin Chuan, the 48th Taiwanese Premier
 Yeh Chu-lan, the 28th Taiwanese Vice Premier (2004–2005)
 Shih Jun-ji, the 36th Taiwanese Vice Premier (2017–2019), professor at National Taiwan University

Ministers
 Andrew Hsia, Minister of Mainland Affairs Council (2015–2016)
 Andrew Yang, Minister of National Defense (2013)
 Chang Chang-pang, Deputy Secretary-General of Executive Yuan 
 Chiang Been-huang, served as the Minister of Health and Welfare from 22 October 2014 to 20 May 2016
 Ho Pei-shan, Deputy Secretary-General of Executive Yuan
 Sun Ta-chuan, Vice President of Control Yuan
 Wang Guangmei, First Lady of the People's Republic of China (1959–1968)
 Wang Ju-hsuan, Minister of Council of Labor Affairs (2008–2012)

International
 Jim Brown, High-level language interpreter of U.S. State Department
 Jhy-Wey Shieh, the diplomatic representative of Taiwan in the Federal Republic of Germany
 Heishiro Ogawa , the first Japanese Ambassador to the People's Republic of China

Congressman and officers
 Chiang Huei-Chen, Legislator for Kuomintang
 Chin Huei-chu, Legislator for Kuomintang 
 Huang Sue-ying, Legislator for Democratic Progressive Party 
 Kao Jyh-peng, Legislator for Democratic Progressive Party 
 Kao Yang-sheng, Legislator for Kuomintang
 Lee Kun-tse, Legislator for Democratic Progressive Party
 Liao Pen-yen, Legislator and member of New Taipei City Council
 Lin Chih-chia, Legislator for Taiwan Solidarity Union 
 Lin Tai-hua, Legislator for Democratic Progressive Party 
 Liou Tzong-Der, Commissioners of National Communications Commission
 Pasuya Yao, Legislator for Democratic Progressive Party
 Tang Huo-shen, Legislator for Democratic Progressive Party 
 Tang Jinn-chuan, Legislator for Democratic Progressive Party 
 Tsai Sheng-pang, Legislator for Kuomintang 
 Walis Perin, a Seediq Taiwanese politician, served four terms in the Legislative Yuan and member of Control Yuan
 Wang Shu-hui, Former legislator for Democratic Progressive Party
 Wu Cherng-dean, Legislator for People First Party
 Yang Ying-hsiung, Legislator for Kuomintang
 Yang Yu-hsin, Legislator for Kuomintang
 Yao Li-ming, Legislator, former professor at National Sun Yat-sen University

Other politicians
 Cheng Nan-jung, Taiwanese publisher and pro-democracy activist who self-immolated in support of Taiwan Independence
 Chou Hsi-wei, Magistrate of Taipei County (2005–2010)
 Hou Chong-wen, Deputy Mayor of Chiayi City
 Huang Ching-yin, politician and former deputy spokesperson for the Taipei City Government
 Liu Shou-cheng, Magistrate of Yilan County (1997–2005)
 Lu Kuo-hua, Magistrate of Yilan County (2005–2009)
 Su Huan-chih, Magistrate of Tainan County (2001–2010)
 Sean Lien, Former Chairman of the Taipei Smart Card Corporation

Academic

American scholar
Lee-Jen Wei: Professor at Harvard University
Chi-ming Hou: Fellow at Harvard University, professor at Colgate University and Brookings Institution
James L.Y. Liu: Professor at Stanford University, University of London, University of Hong Kong
Francis L. K. Hsu: Faculty of Columbia University, Cornell University, Northwestern University, 62nd President of the American Anthropological Association
Esther H. Chang: Professor at Georgetown University Lombardi Cancer Center
Sung-lan Hsia: Professor at Miami University
Kuo-chu Ho: Researcher at the University of Chicago, Professor at Florida State University and Nankai University

Academician
Lee C. Teng: Academician of The Academia Sinica
Xing Qiyi: Academician of The Chinese Academy of Sciences
Xing Qiyi: Academician of The Chinese Academy of Sciences
Li Dongying: Academician of The Chinese Academy of Engineering
Francis L. K. Hsu: Academician of The Academia Sinica

University president and others
Liu Da: President of Tsinghua University and the University of Science and Technology of China
Bernard Li: President of Fu Jen Catholic University
Hou Chong-wen: President of National Taipei University
Chou Kung-shin: Archaeologist, served as Director of National Palace Museum.

Theology
Joche Albert Ly: Chinese Marist Brother
James Lin Xili: First underground Roman Catholic bishop of the Diocese of Wenzhou (1992–2009)

Business
Steve Chang: Co-founder and former CEO of Trend Micro.
Thomas Wu: The founder and chairman of both Taishin Holdings and Taishin International Bank.

Literature and journalism
Hsiao-Hung Pai: UK-based journalist and author
Chang Ta-chun: Fiction writer
Yang-Min Lin: Taiwanese author and poet
Wu Mingyi: Writer, 2018 Man Booker International Prize nomination
Zhang Dachun: Writer

Theatre and film/ visual art and illustration
Stan Lai: Stage play director
Terry Hu: Film actress, writer and translator
Wu Nien-jen: Screenwriter and film director
Reen Yu: Actress and commercial model
Alfonso Wong: Creator of Old Master Q comic strip
Nicky Wu: Famous Taiwanese actor, singer and entrepreneur
Vivian Sung: Taiwanese Actress

Classical music
 Lo Kii-Ming: Taiwanese musicologist and professor of musicology at National Taiwan Normal University
Wu Ting-yu: Taiwanese violinist, currently concertmaster of Taiwan's National Symphony Orchestra

Entertainment
Jolin Tsai: Mandopop singer
MC HotDog: Taiwan's original rapper
Hsueh Shih-ling: actor and member of hip-hop band Da Mouth
An Jun Can: the member of boy band Comic Boyz
Cherry Boom all members
Faye Zhan: F.I.R. members
Vicky Chen, singer

Sport
Chen Chih-yuan: Former Taiwanese baseball player
Pan Wei-lun: Taiwanese professional baseball pitcher
Wu Pai-ho: Taiwanese football player
Lee Fu-an: Taiwanese decathlete
Cheng Chao-tsun: Taiwanese track and field athlete who competes in the javelin throw
Kuo Hsing-chun: Taiwanese weightlifter, Olympian
Huang Yi-ting: Taiwanese competitive rower
Lin Yun-ju: One of youngest table tennis player from Taiwan

References

External links
Fu Jen Catholic University Alumni Association
Fu Jen Alumni database